Anna-Lena Friedsam and Alison Van Uytvanck were the defending champions, but neither player decided to participate.

Margarita Gasparyan and Lyudmyla Kichenok won the tournament, defeating Kristina Barrois and Eleni Daniilidou in the final, 6–2, 6–4.

Seeds

Draw

References 
 Draw

Open GDF Suez Seine-et-Marne - Doubles